The Jilebulake Dam is a concrete-face rock-fill dam on the Haba River, a tributary of the Irtysh, in Habahe County of the Xinjiang Uyghur Autonomous Region in China. The primary purpose of the dam is hydroelectric power generation and it supports a 160 MW power station. During filling, on November 17, the diversion tunnel gate failed and the water inside the reservoir rushed downstream. Locals downstream were evacuated and there was no loss of life. The Yamaguchi Dam just downstream was able to control much of the flooding.

See also

List of dams and reservoirs in China
List of tallest dams in the world
List of tallest dams in China

References

Dams in China
Dams completed in 2013
Hydroelectric power stations in Xinjiang
Energy infrastructure completed in 2013
Concrete-face rock-fill dams
RJilebulake